The following is an alphabetical list of articles related to the U.S. State of Arkansas.

0–9 

.ar.us – Internet second-level domain for the State of Arkansas
25th state to join the United States of America

A
Abortion in Arkansas
Action at Ashley's Station
Adams-Onís Treaty of 1819
Adjacent states:

Agriculture in Arkansas
Airports in Arkansas
Alta Louisiana, 1762–1800
Amusement parks in Arkansas
AR – United States Postal Service postal code for the state of Arkansas
Arboreta in Arkansas
commons:Category:Arboreta in Arkansas
Archaeology in Arkansas
:Category:Archaeological sites in Arkansas
commons:Category:Archaeological sites in Arkansas
Architecture in Arkansas
Arkansas  website
:Category:Arkansas
commons:Category:Arkansas
commons:Category:Maps of Arkansas
Arkansas County, Arkansas
Arkansas in the American Civil War, 1861–1865
Arkansas Post, first territorial capital 1819-1821
Arkansas Post, Arkansas, the unincorporated community near the historical settlement
Arkansas Razorbacks and Arkansas Ladybacks
Arkansas lunar sample displays
Arkansas Register of Historic Places
Arkansas River
Arkansas State Capitol
Arkansas State Police
Arkansas Teacher Corps
Arkansas–Texas League
Art museums and galleries in Arkansas
commons:Category:Art museums and galleries in Arkansas
Ashley County, Arkansas
Astronomical observatories in Arkansas
commons:Category:Astronomical observatories in Arkansas
Attorney General of the State of Arkansas

B
Battle of Arkansas Post (1863)
Battle of Bayou Fourche
Battle of Bayou Meto
Battle of Brownsville, Arkansas
Battle of Cane Hill
Battle of Chalk Bluff
Battle of Cotton Plant
Battle of Devil's Backbone
Battle of Elkin's Ferry
Battle of Fayetteville (1863)
Battle of Fort Smith
Battle of Helena
Battle of Jenkins' Ferry
Battle of Marks' Mills
Battle of Massard Prairie
Battle of Mount Elba
Battle of Old River Lake
Battle of Pea Ridge
Battle of Pine Bluff
Battle of Poison Spring
Battle of Prairie D'Ane
Battle of Prairie Grove
Battle of Saint Charles
Battle of Van Buren
Battle of Whitney's Lane
Baxter County, Arkansas
Benton County, Arkansas
Bentonville, Arkansas
Bono, Arkansas
Boone County, Arkansas
Botanical gardens in Arkansas
commons:Category:Botanical gardens in Arkansas
Bradley County, Arkansas
Buildings and structures in Arkansas
commons:Category:Buildings and structures in Arkansas

C

Calhoun County, Arkansas
Capital of the State of Arkansas
Capital punishment in Arkansas
Capitol of the State of Arkansas
commons:Category:Arkansas State Capitol
Carroll County, Arkansas
Caves of Arkansas
commons:Category:Caves of Arkansas
Census statistical areas of Arkansas
Chicot County, Arkansas
Cities in Arkansas
commons:Category:Cities in Arkansas
Clark County, Arkansas
Clay County, Arkansas
Cleburne County, Arkansas
Cleveland County, Arkansas
Climate of Arkansas
Climate change in Arkansas 
Colleges and universities in Arkansas
commons:Category:Universities and colleges in Arkansas
Columbia County, Arkansas
Communications in Arkansas
commons:Category:Communications in Arkansas

Companies in Arkansas
:Category:Companies based in Arkansas
Congressional districts of Arkansas
Constitution of the State of Arkansas
Convention centers in Arkansas
commons:Category:Convention centers in Arkansas
Conway County, Arkansas
Conway, Arkansas
Counties of the state of Arkansas
commons:Category:Counties in Arkansas
Craighead County, Arkansas
Crawford County, Arkansas
Crittenden County, Arkansas
Cross County, Arkansas
Culture of Arkansas
commons:Category:Arkansas culture

D
Dallas County, Arkansas
Demographics of Arkansas
Desha County, Arkansas
District of Louisiana, 1804–1805
Drew County, Arkansas

E
Economy of Arkansas
:Category:Economy of Arkansas
commons:Category:Economy of Arkansas
Education in Arkansas
:Category:Education in Arkansas
commons:Category:Education in Arkansas
Elections of the state of Arkansas
commons:Category:Arkansas elections
Environment of Arkansas
commons:Category:Environment of Arkansas

F

Faulkner County, Arkansas
Fayetteville, Arkansas
Flag of the State of Arkansas
Forts in Arkansas
:Category:Forts in Arkansas
commons:Category:Forts in Arkansas

Fort Smith, Arkansas
 Franklin County, Arkansas
 Fulton County, Arkansas

G

Garland County, Arkansas
Geography of Arkansas
:Category:Geography of Arkansas
commons:Category:Geography of Arkansas
Geology of Arkansas
commons:Category:Geology of Arkansas
Ghost towns in Arkansas
:Category:Ghost towns in Arkansas
commons:Category:Ghost towns in Arkansas
Golf clubs and courses in Arkansas
Goobertown, Arkansas
Government of the state of Arkansas  website
:Category:Government of Arkansas
commons:Category:Government of Arkansas
Governor of the State of Arkansas
List of governors of Arkansas
Grant County, Arkansas
Great Seal of the State of Arkansas
Greene County, Arkansas
Gun laws in Arkansas

H
Harrison, Arkansas
Hempstead County, Arkansas
Herbine, Arkansas
Heritage railroads in Arkansas
commons:Category:Heritage railroads in Arkansas
High schools of Arkansas
Higher education in Arkansas
Hiking trails in Arkansas
commons:Category:Hiking trails in Arkansas
History of Arkansas
Historical outline of Arkansas
:Category:History of Arkansas
commons:Category:History of Arkansas
Hospitals in Arkansas
Hot Spring County, Arkansas
Hot Springs, Arkansas
Hot springs of Arkansas
commons:Category:Hot springs of Arkansas
House of Representatives of the State of Arkansas
Howard County, Arkansas

I
Images of Arkansas
commons:Category:Arkansas
Independence County, Arkansas
Ivory-billed woodpecker, long thought extinct, possibly re-discovered in the Big Woods of Arkansas
Islands in Arkansas
Izard County, Arkansas

J

Jackson County, Arkansas
Jefferson County, Arkansas
Johnson County, Arkansas
Jonesboro, Arkansas

K
 Kavanaugh, William Marmaduke
 Kirby, William

L
Lafayette County, Arkansas
La Haute-Louisiane, 1800–1803
La Louisiane, 1699–1762
Lakes in Arkansas
:Category:Lakes of Arkansas
commons:Category:Lakes of Arkansas
Landmarks in Arkansas
commons:Category:Landmarks in Arkansas
Lawrence County, Arkansas
Lee County, Arkansas
Lieutenant Governor of the State of Arkansas
Lincoln County, Arkansas
Lists related to the state of Arkansas:
List of airports in Arkansas
List of census statistical areas in Arkansas
List of cities in Arkansas
List of colleges and universities in Arkansas
List of companies in Arkansas
List of United States congressional districts in Arkansas
List of counties in Arkansas
List of individuals executed in Arkansas
List of forts in Arkansas
List of ghost towns in Arkansas
List of governors of Arkansas
List of high schools in Arkansas
List of highways in Arkansas
List of hospitals in Arkansas
List of islands in Arkansas
List of lakes in Arkansas
List of law enforcement agencies in Arkansas
List of lieutenant governors of Arkansas
List of museums in Arkansas
List of National Historic Landmarks in Arkansas
List of native plants of Arkansas
List of people from Arkansas
List of places in Arkansas
List of radio stations in Arkansas
List of railroads in Arkansas
List of Registered Historic Places in Arkansas
List of rivers of Arkansas
List of school districts in Arkansas
List of snakes in Arkansas
List of state forests in Arkansas
List of state highway routes in Arkansas
List of state parks in Arkansas
List of state prisons in Arkansas
List of state symbols of Arkansas
List of television stations in Arkansas
List of United States congressional delegations from Arkansas
List of United States congressional districts in Arkansas
List of United States representatives from Arkansas
List of United States senators from Arkansas
Literature of Arkansas
Little River County, Arkansas
Little Rock, Arkansas, territorial and state capital since 1821
Little Rock Nine, 1957
Logan County, Arkansas
Lonoke County, Arkansas
Louisiana Purchase of 1803

M
Madison County, Arkansas
Main Street Arkansas
Maps of Arkansas
Marion County, Arkansas
Miller County, Arkansas
Mississippi County, Arkansas
Mississippi River
Monroe County, Arkansas
Montgomery County, Arkansas
Mountains of Arkansas
commons:Category:Mountains of Arkansas
Museums in Arkansas
:Category:Museums in Arkansas
commons:Category:Museums in Arkansas
Music of Arkansas
:Category:Music of Arkansas
commons:Category:Music of Arkansas
:Category:Musical groups from Arkansas
:Category:Musicians from Arkansas

N
National Forests of Arkansas
commons:Category:National Forests of Arkansas
Native plants of Arkansas
Natural history of Arkansas
commons:Category:Natural history of Arkansas
Nevada County, Arkansas
News media in Arkansas
Newspapers of Arkansas
Newton County, Arkansas

O
Ouachita County, Arkansas
Outdoor sculptures in Arkansas
commons:Category:Outdoor sculptures in Arkansas
Ozark Southern Stone quarry

P
Paragould, Arkansas
People from Arkansas
:Category:People from Arkansas
commons:Category:People from Arkansas
:Category:People by city in Arkansas
:Category:People by county in Arkansas
:Category:People from Arkansas by occupation
Perry County, Arkansas
Phillips County, Arkansas
Pike County, Arkansas
Places in Arkansas
Poinsett County, Arkansas
Politics of Arkansas
commons:Category:Politics of Arkansas
Polk County, Arkansas
Pope County, Arkansas
Prairie County, Arkansas
Protected areas of Arkansas
commons:Category:Protected areas of Arkansas

 Pulaski County, Arkansas

Q
 Quarles, Donald
 Quarles, Greenfield

R
Radio stations in Arkansas
Railroad museums in Arkansas
commons:Category:Railroad museums in Arkansas
Railroads in Arkansas
Randolph County, Arkansas
Registered historic places in Arkansas
commons:Category:Registered Historic Places in Arkansas
Religion in Arkansas
:Category:Religion in Arkansas
commons:Category:Religion in Arkansas
Rivers of Arkansas
commons:Category:Rivers of Arkansas
Rogers, Arkansas
Roller coasters in Arkansas
commons:Category:Roller coasters in Arkansas

S
Saline County, Arkansas
Same-sex marriage in Arkansas
School districts of Arkansas
Scott County, Arkansas
Scouting in Arkansas
Searcy County, Arkansas
Sebastian County, Arkansas
Senate of the State of Arkansas
Settlements in Arkansas
Cities in Arkansas
Towns in Arkansas
Census Designated Places in Arkansas
Other unincorporated communities in Arkansas
List of ghost towns in Arkansas
List of places in Arkansas
Sevier County, Arkansas
Sharp County, Arkansas
Skirmish at Aberdeen
Skirmish at Terre Noire Creek
Skirmish at Threkeld's Ferry
South Arkansas
Sports in Arkansas
commons:Category:Sports in Arkansas
Sports venues in Arkansas
commons:Category:Sports venues in Arkansas
State Capitol of Arkansas
State highway routes in Arkansas
State of Arkansas  website
Constitution of the State of Arkansas
Government of the state of Arkansas
:Category:Government of Arkansas
commons:Category:Government of Arkansas
Executive branch of the government of the state of Arkansas
Governor of the State of Arkansas
Legislative branch of the government of the state of Arkansas
General Assembly of the State of Arkansas
Senate of the State of Arkansas
House of Representatives of the State of Arkansas
Judicial branch of the government of the state of Arkansas
Supreme Court of the State of Arkansas
Arkansas Court of Appeals
State parks of Arkansas
commons:Category:State parks of Arkansas
State Police of Arkansas
State prisons of Arkansas
St. Francis County, Arkansas
Stone County, Arkansas
Structures in Arkansas
commons:Category:Buildings and structures in Arkansas
Superfund sites in Arkansas
Supreme Court of the State of Arkansas
Symbols of the state of Arkansas
:Category:Symbols of Arkansas
commons:Category:Symbols of Arkansas

T
Telecommunications in Arkansas
commons:Category:Communications in Arkansas
Telephone area codes in Arkansas
Television shows set in Arkansas
Television stations in Arkansas
Territory of Arkansas, 1819–1836
Territory of Louisiana, 1805–1812
Territory of Missouri, (1812–1819)-1821
Theatres in Arkansas
commons:Category:Theatres in Arkansas
Third Treaty of San Ildefonso of 1800
Tourism in Arkansas  website
commons:Category:Tourism in Arkansas
Trail of Tears, 1830–1838
Transportation in Arkansas
:Category:Transportation in Arkansas
commons:Category:Transport in Arkansas
Treaty of Fontainebleau of 1762

U
Union County, Arkansas
United States of America
States of the United States of America
United States census statistical areas of Arkansas
United States congressional delegations from Arkansas
United States congressional districts in Arkansas
United States Court of Appeals for the Eighth Circuit
United States District Court for the Eastern District of Arkansas
United States District Court for the Western District of Arkansas
United States representatives from Arkansas
United States senators from Arkansas
Universities and colleges in Arkansas
commons:Category:Universities and colleges in Arkansas
US-AR – ISO 3166-2:US region code for the state of Arkansas

V

 Van Buren County, Arkansas

W
Washington County, Arkansas
Water parks in Arkansas
Wikimedia
Wikimedia Commons:Category:Arkansas
commons:Category:Maps of Arkansas
Wikinews:Category:Arkansas
Wikinews:Portal:Arkansas
Wikipedia Category:Arkansas
Wikipedia Portal:Arkansas
Wikipedia:WikiProject Arkansas
:Category:WikiProject Arkansas articles
:Category:WikiProject Arkansas members
Weiner, Arkansas
 White County, Arkansas
 Woodruff County, Arkansas

X

Y
 Yell County, Arkansas
 Henry Clay Yerger

Z
Zoos in Arkansas
commons:Category:Zoos in Arkansas

See also

Topic overview:
Arkansas
Outline of Arkansas

Arkansas Skywarn weather

Arkansas
 
Arkansas